Talvi Märja (née Talvi Väli; born 8 September 1935 in Tallinn) is an Estonian tennis player, coach, andragogue, psychologist and politician. She was a member of VIII Riigikogu.

References

Living people
1935 births
Estonian educators
Estonian female tennis players
Estonian tennis coaches
Estonian psychologists
Estonian Coalition Party politicians
Members of the Riigikogu, 1995–1999
Women members of the Riigikogu
Recipients of the Order of the White Star, 4th Class
University of Tartu alumni
Academic staff of Tallinn University
People from Tallinn
Politicians from Tallinn